{{DISPLAYTITLE:pCO2}}

pCO2, pCO2, or is the partial pressure of carbon dioxide (CO2), often used in reference to blood but also used in meteorology, climate science, oceanography, and limnology to describe the fractional pressure of CO2 as a function of its concentration in gas or dissolved phases.   The units of pCO2 are mmHg, atm, torr, Pa, or any other standard unit of atmospheric pressure.  The pCO2 of Earth's atmosphere has risen from approximately 280 ppm (parts-per-million) to a mean 2019 value of 409.8 ppm as a result of anthropogenic release of carbon dioxide from fossil fuel burning.  This is the highest atmospheric concentration to have existed on Earth for at least the last 800,000 years.

Medicine 

In medicine, the partial pressure of carbon dioxide in arterial blood is called  or PaCO2. It is a good indicator of respiratory function and the closely related factor of acid–base homeostasis, reflecting the amount of acid in the blood (without lactic acid). Normal values for humans are in the range 35–45 mmHg. Values less than this may indicate hyperventilation and (if blood pH is greater than 7.45) respiratory alkalosis. Values greater than 45 mmHg may indicate hypoventilation, and (if blood pH is less than 7.35) respiratory acidosis.

Aquatic sciences 

Oceanographers and limnologists use pCO2 to measure the amount of carbon dioxide dissolved in water, as well as to parameterize its flux into (influx) and out of (efflux) the atmosphere.  Carbon dioxide reacts with water to form bicarbonate and carbonate ions, such that the relative solubility of carbon dioxide in water is greater than that of other unreactive gasses (e.g. Helium).  As more carbon dioxide dissolves in water, its pCO2 rises until it equals the pCO2 of the overlying atmosphere.  Conversely, a body of water with a pCO2 greater than that of the atmosphere effluxes carbon dioxide.

pCO2 is additionally affected by water temperature and salinity.  Carbon dioxide is less soluble in warmer water than cooler water, so hot water will exhibit a larger pCO2 than cold water with the same concentration of carbon dioxide.  pCO2 can be used to describe the inorganic carbon system of a body of water, together with other parameters such as pH, dissolved inorganic carbon, and alkalinity.   Together, these parameters describe the concentration and speciation of inorganic carbon species (CO2 (aq), HCO3−, CO32-) in water.

Biological processes such as respiration and photosynthesis affect and can be affected by aquatic pCO2.  Respiration degrades organic matter, releasing CO2 into the water column and increasing pCO2.  Photosynthesis assimilates inorganic carbon, thereby decreasing aquatic pCO2.

See also 
 Acidosis
 Alkalosis
 Arterial blood gas
 Blood gas tension
 Chemical equilibrium
 Hypercapnia
 pH
Carbon Cycle
 xCO2

References 

Acid–base chemistry
Analytical chemistry
Equilibrium chemistry
Units of measurement
Chemical oceanography
Limnology